The Los Angeles City Controller is an official in the government of the city of Los Angeles, California. The City Controller is the paymaster and chief accounting officer of the city. Along with the Mayor and the City Attorney, the City Controller is chosen by popular vote every four years.

The position began in 1878 as the Los Angeles City Auditor and in the early days included secretarial duties for the Los Angeles Common Council as part of the job. Upon the re-election of John S. Myers in 1925, when the city approved a new charter, the name of the position was changed to City Controller. In 2000, another update to the city charter added the power and responsibility of conducting "performance audits" of departmental effectiveness.

List of City Controllers
City Auditor (1879–1925)

City Controller (1925–present)

References

External links

 Official Website of the City Controller

Controller